Aliza Bin-Noun is an Israeli diplomat. She serves as the Israeli Ambassador to France and Monaco.

Biography
Aliza Bin-Noun grew up near Nahariya, in northern Israel. Her Hungarian paternal grandparents were deported to the Auschwitz concentration camp during World War II. Her father is a Holocaust survivor.

Bin-Noun graduated from the Hebrew University of Jerusalem, where she studied French. She served in the Israel Defense Forces. Bin-Noun is married to Claus, with whom she has  two daughters.

Diplomatic career
Bin-Noun is a career diplomat. From 2001 to 2006, she was Advisor in the Arms Control Division, followed by Advisor in Political Affairs, and Director of Department of Coordination Bureau. She served as Israel's ambassador in Budapest, Hungary from 2007 to 2011. In 2012, she was appointed as the Head of the Political Bureau in the Israeli Ministry of Foreign Affairs.

Since August 2015, Bin-Noun has served as the Israeli Ambassador to France. She is the first female Israeli ambassador to France. Since December 2015, Bin-Noun has also served as the Israeli Ambassador to Monaco.

See also
Women of Israel

References

Living people
Hebrew University of Jerusalem alumni
Ambassadors of Israel to France
Ambassadors of Israel to Monaco
Ambassadors of Israel to Hungary
Israeli women ambassadors
Israeli people of Hungarian-Jewish descent
Year of birth missing (living people)